Joe Dean Davenport II (born October 29, 1976) is a former American football tight end. He played college football at Arkansas. From 2001 to 2003, he played for the Indianapolis Colts of the National Football League (NFL).

References

1976 births
Living people
American football tight ends
Arkansas Razorbacks football players
Arkansas Razorbacks men's basketball players
Indianapolis Colts players
People from Springdale, Arkansas
American men's basketball players
Players of American football from Arkansas
Forwards (basketball)